Faget may refer to:

People with the surname
Alfredo Faget (1923–2003), Cuban basketball player
Jean Charles Faget (1818–1884), American physician
Faget sign, a medical sign of fever and bradycardia indicating yellow fever
Guy Henry Faget (1891–1947), American physician
Maxime Faget (1921–2004), American engineer
Mignon Faget (born 1933), American jewelry designer

Places
Le Faget,  commune in the Haute-Garonne department in southwestern France
Faget-Abbatial commune in the Gers department in southwestern France
Mount Faget, Antarctic mountain

Other uses
"Faget" (song), a 1994 song by the nu metal group Korn from their album Korn
Faget sign, a medical sign of fever and bradycardia indicating yellow fever

See also
Făget (disambiguation), several places in Romania
Fagot (disambiguation)
Faggot (disambiguation)